"Gimme Gimme" is a song by Italian Eurodance project Whigfield which was performed by Danish-born Sannie Charlotte Carlson. It was released on the 4 November 1996, as the first single from her second album, Whigfield II (1997). The following year, the song went to number 14 in Australia and number four in Spain. It also peaked at number 37 on the Eurochart Hot 100 in late 1996. "Gimme Gimme" sold to gold in Australia after 35,000 singles were sold there.

Track listing
 "Gimme Gimme" (American radio / video version) 3:47
 "Gimme Gimme" (Original radio / video vox) 4:02
 "Gimme Gimme" (American mix) 5:17
 "Gimme Gimme" (MBRG radio mix) 3:24
" Gimme Gimme" (extended vox) 6:16
 "Gimme Gimme" (MBRG extended mix) 5:35

Credits
Mastered by – Peter Brussee
Producer – Larry Pignagnoli
Produced, arranged by, mixed by – Davide Riva
Written by – Annerley Gordon, Davide Riva and Paul Sears.

Charts

Certifications

References

1996 songs
1996 singles
Whigfield songs
Songs written by Ann Lee (singer)
Bertelsmann Music Group singles